"My Eyes Adored You" is a 1974 song written by Bob Crewe and Kenny Nolan. It was originally recorded by The Four Seasons in early 1974. After the Motown label balked at the idea of releasing it, the recording was sold to lead singer Frankie Valli for $4000. After rejections by Capitol and Atlantic Records, Valli succeeded in getting the recording released on Private Stock Records, but the owner/founder of the label, Larry Uttal, wanted only Valli's name on the label. The single was released in the US in November 1974 and topped the Billboard Hot 100 in March 1975. "My Eyes Adored You" also went to number 2 on the Easy Listening chart. Billboard ranked it as the No. 5 song for 1975.

The single was Valli's first number 1 hit as a solo artist on Billboard's Hot 100, and remained there for one week, being knocked out of the top spot by another Crewe/Nolan-penned song, "Lady Marmalade" by Labelle. Although it was released as a Valli solo effort, the song is sometimes included on Four Seasons compilation albums. It is from the album Closeup.

Cash Box called it "a mellow ballad sung only the way Frankie's sweet vocal could sing it," saying "lush instrumentation heightens the record's overall effect which is one of a fine musical outing."  Record World said that "Charlie Calello charts bring Valli back up top 40 mountain."

The success of "My Eyes Adored You" triggered a revival of interest in recordings by The Four Seasons. The band was subsequently signed to Warner Bros. Records as Valli's follow-up single "Swearin' to God" was climbing to number 6 on the Hot 100.

Charts

Weekly charts

Year-end charts

Personnel
 Frankie Valli – vocals
 Joe Long – bass guitar, vocals
 Demetri Callas – lead guitar, vocals
 Gerry Polci – drums, vocals
 Lee Shapiro – keyboards

Other versions

 Andy Williams released a version in 1975 on his album, The Other Side of Me.
 The song was recorded in 1976 by Fred Astaire with the Pete Moore Orchestra for the album Attitude Dancing  (United Artists Records UA-LA580-G).
 Marty Mitchell's 1976 version reached #87 on the country chart.
 Jack Jones - for his album Nobody Does It Better (1979). 
 Toni Gonzaga and Sam Milby - You Got Me soundtrack (2007)
 Barry Manilow - The Greatest Songs of the Seventies (2007)
 Fujii Kaze - Help Ever Hurt Cover (2020)

References

External links
 

1974 singles
Songs written by Bob Crewe
Songs written by Kenny Nolan
Billboard Hot 100 number-one singles
Cashbox number-one singles
Frankie Valli songs
The Four Seasons (band) songs
Andy Williams songs
1974 songs
Private Stock Records singles
Number-one singles in New Zealand